Rédouane Youcef (born 29 January 1974) is a retired Algerian decathlete.

He won gold medals at the 1998 and 2000 African Championships, and a bronze medal at the 2002 African Championships. He won the silver medal at the 1999 All-Africa Games and the bronze medal at the 2003 All-Africa Games. He became Algerian champion five times in hurdles and long jump, and several times in the decathlon.

References

1974 births
Living people
Algerian decathletes
African Games silver medalists for Algeria
African Games medalists in athletics (track and field)
African Games bronze medalists for Algeria
Athletes (track and field) at the 1999 All-Africa Games
Athletes (track and field) at the 2003 All-Africa Games
Islamic Solidarity Games competitors for Algeria
Islamic Solidarity Games medalists in athletics
21st-century Algerian people
20th-century Algerian people